The 1912 Tulane Olive and Blue football team was an American football team that represented Tulane University as a member of the Southern Intercollegiate Athletic Association (SIAA) during the 1912 college football season. In its third year under head coach Appleton A. Mason, Tulane compiled a 5–3 record.

Schedule

References

Tulane
Tulane Green Wave football seasons
Tulane Olive and Blue football